Enrico Paoli (January 13, 1908 – December 15, 2005) was an Italian International chess master.

He was born in Trieste, Italy, and learned chess when he was nine years old. He was the winner of international tournaments in Vienna (1951) and Imperia (1959). Paoli won his last Italian Championship at age 60, and organized the famous Reggio Emilia chess tournament. He beat Soviet GM Alexander Kotov with the black pieces in Venice in 1950, but missed receiving the Grandmaster title by only half a point at a tournament in 1969. He was awarded an honorary grandmaster title in 1996 by FIDE.

References

External links
 
 Kotov vs Paoli, 0-1 (requires Java plugin)

1908 births
2005 deaths
Chess grandmasters
Italian chess players
20th-century chess players